Wudalianchi, formerly Dedu County, is a county-level city in Heilongjiang province, China. It is under the jurisdiction of the prefecture-level city of Heihe.

It contains a volcanic field.

The city's name means "five joint ponds" and refers to a set of interconnected lakes formed after the eruption of the volcanoes of Laoheishan (means "Old Black Mountain") and Huoshaoshan (means "Fire Burn Mountain") in 1720–21.

The city is served by Wudalianchi Dedu Airport.

Administrative divisions 
Wudalianchi City is divided into 1 subdistrict, 7 towns and 4 townships. 
1 subdistrict
 Qingshan
7 towns
 Long, Heping, Wudalianchi, Shuangquan, Xinfa, Tuanjie, Xinglong
4 townships
 Jianshe, Taiping, Xing'an, Zhaoyang

Demographics 

Climate

See also
 List of UNESCO Global Geoparks in Asia

References

External links

County level divisions of Heilongjiang
Cities in Heilongjiang
Volcanoes of China
Landforms of Heilongjiang
 
Heihe